Juan José "Sesé" Rivero Rodríguez (born 3 October 1969) is a Spanish football manager, and currently works as a youth football coordinator at CD Tenerife.

Career
Born in Puerto de la Cruz, Tenerife, Canary Islands, Rivero played youth football for CD Puerto Cruz, but retired at early age. In 1998, after acting as David Amaral's assistant at UD Realejos and CD Corralejo, he joined CD Tenerife as a fitness coach.

Rivero was named Amaral's assistant at Tete for the 2003–04 season. In January 2004, as Amaral was sacked, he remained at the club but assigned to the youth squads.

Rivero was again named Amaral's assistant in January 2006, also at Tenerife. After Amaral left, he returned to his previous role as a director of the youth squads. In 2012, he also acted as an interim manager of the B-team for the latter stages of the season.

On 17 November 2019, Rivero replaced sacked Aritz López Garai at the helm of Tenerife's first team. His first professional match in charge occurred five days later, a 2–0 away defeat of Sporting de Gijón.

On 2 December 2019, after the appointment of Rubén Baraja as manager, Rivero returned to his previous role.

Personal life
Rivero's younger brother Fabián is also a manager, who also worked at Tenerife for many years.

Managerial statistics

References

External links

1969 births
Living people
Sportspeople from Puerto de la Cruz
Spanish football managers
Segunda División managers
CD Tenerife managers